XHCQ-FM is a radio station on 98.5 FM in Tuxtla Gutiérrez, Chiapas, Mexico. It carries the Exa FM pop format from MVS Radio.

History
XHCQ received its concession on March 19, 1979. It was owned by Omelino Chong Villatoro but operated by Radiorama. The station is currently owned by Simón Valanci Buzali's Grupo Radio Digital.

References

Contemporary hit radio stations in Mexico
Radio stations in Chiapas
Radio stations established in 1979
1979 establishments in Mexico
Spanish-language radio stations